The Samsung Training Center is training & rehabilitation center of Samsung Sports. It is located in Samsung Life Human Center, Yongin.
It is lived for Seoul Samsung Thunders, Daejeon Samsung Bluefangs, Yongin Samsung Blueminx, Samsung Life Table Tennis Club, Samsung Life Wrestling Club, Samsung S1 Taekwondo Club. and It is used for all Samsung Sports teams. It has the area of 24,476.7 m2.

See also 
 Samsung Sports

References

External links 
 Samsung Sports - STC introduction 

Samsung Sports
Samsung
Sport in Yongin
2007 establishments in South Korea
Sports venues completed in 2007
Buildings and structures in Yongin